Struthiola tetralepis is a willowy shrublet of up to  high that is assigned to the family Thymelaeaceae. It has long straight branches that are initially hairy and are covered in leaves pressed against them. These leaves are small, overlapping, lance-shaped, sharply pointed, have a regular row of hairs along the margins, and 3-5 veins are visible on the outward facing surface. It flowers between October and February. It can be found in the southwest of the Western Cape province of South Africa. It is sometimes called cross capespray in English.

Taxonomy 
This species was first described as Struthiola tetralepis by Rudolf Schlechter in 1900, based on a plant he collected himself at Franschhoek. He distinguished two varieties, S. tetralepis var. tetralepis and S. tetralepis  var. glabricaulis. Charles Henry Wright in 1915 considered the varieties insufficiently characterised and regarded S. tetralepis var. glabricaulis a synonym of S. tetralepis.

Description 
The leaves are in pairs opposing each other, initially pressed against the branches, but less so further down, overlapping each other, with the blade directly attached to the branche without a leaf stalk.

The flowers are seated in the axils of the leaves over a considerable length towards the tip of the branches, an inflorescence type called a spike.

Four yellow, fleshy, petal-like scales are implanted above and alternating with the sepal lobes, and are surrounded by stiff hairs longer than the scales.

Differences with related species 
Struthiola has its flowers arranged in long spikes and every flower contains 4 anthers, whereas Gnidia differs from it in having its flowers in short spikes, solitary or more often in heads and anthers in 2 whorls of 4 or 5 each. Both Lachnaea, Passerina and a few Gnidia-species lack scales on the calyx tubes. Both S. striata and S. tetralepis have four petal-like scales implanted at the opening of the calyx tube, while the many dozens of remaining Struthiola species have eight or twelve scales.

Distribution, ecology and conservation 
Struthiola tetralepis is only known to grow on shale bands in the Hottentots Holland Mountains between Villiersdorp and Franschhoek in a vegetation type known as Cape Wineland Shale Fynbos. The continued survival of this species is considered to be of least concern because its populations are stable.

References 

Thymelaeoideae
Flora of South Africa